Socatel (Société Centrafricaine de Télécommunications) is the leading telecommunications and Internet service provider in the Central African Republic. The Central African government owns 60% of its stock, with France Câbles et Radio, an affiliate of France Telecom, owning 40%.

Socatel's subsidiaries include Caratel, a mobile phone service provider.

See also
 Telecommunications in the Central African Republic
 Media of the Central African Republic

External links
 Socatel corporate site 
 Socatel's main page on Annulaires Afrique

Bangui
Companies of the Central African Republic
Telecommunications companies of the Central African Republic
Telecommunications companies established in 1990
1990 establishments in the Central African Republic